The 2011–12 season of the Oberliga Baden-Württemberg, the highest association football league in Baden-Württemberg, was the fourth season of the league at tier five (V) of the German football league system and the 35th season overall since establishment of the league in 1978.

The champions, SSV Ulm 1846, were promoted to the new Regionalliga Südwest, the bottom three teams, 1. FC Normannia Gmünd, SV Bonlanden and VfL Kirchheim/Teck, relegated to the Verbandsligas. Kirchheim withdrew its team shortly before the start of the season and did not play any league matches. The FV Illertissen opted to leave the Württemberg FA at the end of the season and join the Bavarian FA instead, competing in the Regionalliga Bayern in 2012–13.

For league champions SSV Ulm 1846 it was the seventh title in the Oberliga Baden-Württemberg and it came only a year after the club had become insolvent in the Regionalliga Süd and had been relegated.

The league's top scorer was Alexander Zimmermann of SV Spielberg with 21 goals.

Season
The league featured five new clubs for the 2011–12 season:
 SSV Ulm 1846, relegated from the Regionalliga Süd
 VfR Mannheim and SV Spielberg, promoted from the Verbandsliga Baden
 Offenburger FV, promoted from the Verbandsliga Südbaden
 SV Bonlanden, promoted from the Verbandsliga Württemberg

League table

Results

Promotion to the Oberliga
The three Verbandsliga champions SGV Freiberg (Württemberg), TSV Grunbach (Baden) and FC Singen 04 (Südbaden) were directly promoted to the Oberliga. A fourth place in the league for 2012–13 was determined through a promotion round between the three Verbandsliga runners-up, with the FSV 08 Bissingen earning promotion:

First round

Second round

References

External links
 2011–12 season of the Oberliga Baden-Württemberg at Soccerway.com
 2011–12 season of the Oberliga Baden-Württemberg at Fussballdaten.de 
 2011–12 season of the Oberliga Baden-Württemberg at Weltfussball.de 

Baden
Oberliga Baden-Württemberg seasons